AGCC may refer to:

Marine Corps Air Ground Combat Center Twentynine Palms
Alderney Gambling Control Commission
Action for a Global Climate Community
anthropogenic global climate change